Deinocerites cancer, the crabhole mosquito, is a species of mosquito in the family Culicidae.

Feeding
The feeding pattern of the female D. Cancer is about 75% avian hosts and 25% mammals. Those avian hosts being wading birds and the mammals tend to be primarily rabbits.

References

External links

 

Culicinae
Articles created by Qbugbot
Insects described in 1901